The Nubra River is a river in the Nubra Valley of Ladakh in India. It is a tributary of the Shyok River (a part of the Indus River system) and originates from the Siachen Glacier, the second-longest non-polar glacier in the world. In earlier Tibetan maps, it was referred as Yarma Tsangpo.

Geography
They merge about one kilometer downstream and becomes the Nubra river. Numerous other glaciers of the Karakoram descend into Nubra. It then flows between the Karakoram range and the Saltoro Mountains in a general southeasterly direction for about  before its confluence with the Shyok River near Diskit, forming the Nubra Valley.

The side valleys of the Nubra Valley contains some 33 glaciers of varying proportions, and the heavy sediment load carried by the river from the melt-water is responsible for many glacio-fluvial deposits including braided channels, outwash plains and alluvial fans. The area has a very arid climate, and the lack of precipitation and the high elevation means that the upper reaches of the valley are nearly devoid of vegetation. At its junction with the Shyok, the sandy flats support patches of Tamarix and Myricaria. There are small villages at the foot of ravines, where poplars and willow trees grow. Small pasture fields have been enclosed on the un-denuded fans and fruit trees are grown.

Siachen Conflict 

The river was rafted by an Indo-German team in 1978 under the leadership of Narendra Kumar. Certain features in the maps used by the Germans led to India's understanding of cartographic aggression by Pakistan and a subsequent mountaineering reconnaissance expedition of the region was planned; which in turn led to Operation Meghdoot.

Ecological crisis
The Siachen Glacier, the source of the Nubra River, has for some time been the scene of conflict  between India and Pakistan, and has been called the world's highest battleground. The 20,000 troops stationed on the glacier produce a lot of waste, 40% of which is plastic and metal. This debris, including irreparable vehicles, war debris, parachute material, canisters, clothing, and human waste, is simply tipped into crevasses in the glacier. With no natural biodegradation taking place, the ice is being permanently contaminated by toxins such as cobalt, cadmium, and chromium. The washing of warfare clothes at hot sulfur springs near the Indian base camp also contaminates the river. The toxins will eventually reach the Indus River, with millions of downstream users potentially being impacted.

Notes

References

Tributaries of the Indus River
Rivers of India
Rivers of Ladakh
Karakoram